The men's 100 metre backstroke event at the 1952 Olympic Games took place between 30 July and 1 August, at the Swimming Stadium. This swimming event used the backstroke. Because an Olympic size swimming pool is 50 metres long, this race consisted of two lengths of the pool.

Medalists

Results

Heats
Heat 1

Heat 2

Heat 3

Heat 4

Heat 5

Heat 6

Tie-breaker

Final

Key: OR = Olympic record

References

Men's backstroke 100 metre
Men's events at the 1952 Summer Olympics